SS Nomadic was a steamship of the White Star Line. She was laid down in 1891, in yard 236 at Harland and Wolff Shipyards, Belfast, as a livestock carrier and completed on 14 April 1891.

She sailed from Liverpool on her maiden voyage to New York on 24 April 1891 and spent the next few years on this service. She was requisitioned as a troopship and horse transport in October 1899 and spent the two years of the Boer War on this service, making three trips to the cape under the designation 'HM Transport No. 34'.

She was transferred to the Dominion Line in 1903, as part of the reorganisation of the International Mercantile Marine Co. and was renamed SS Cornishman in 1904. In 1911, another SS Nomadic was made. She made voyages to the US and Canada, continuing to sail these routes after her transfer to Frederick Leyland & Co. in 1921. She was finally withdrawn from service and scrapped in 1926.

References

Ships of the White Star Line at red-duster.co.uk

1891 ships
Ships of the White Star Line
Ships built in Belfast
Merchant ships of the United Kingdom
Steamships of the United Kingdom
Troop ships of the Royal Navy
World War I merchant ships of the United Kingdom
Ships built by Harland and Wolff
Livestock transportation vehicles